Kostyantyn Mykolayovych Bocharov (born 11 April 1997), better known by his stage name Mélovin (stylised as MÉLOVIN), is a Ukrainian singer and songwriter. He first came to prominence after winning season six of X-Factor Ukraine.

He represented Ukraine in the Eurovision Song Contest 2018 in Lisbon, Portugal, with the song "Under the Ladder", finishing in seventeenth place, with 130 points.

Early life
Bocharov was born in Odesa to parents Mykola Bocharov and Valentyna Bocharova. He became interested in music at a young age, and as a child would put on and perform in concerts at his school. He later began attending a music school, but left before graduating. He subsequently enrolled in a theatre school, which he graduated from.

Career

2015–2016: X-Factor Ukraine
Bocharov had auditioned for X-Factor Ukraine three times, but never got onto the televised show. Eventually, he passed his audition for the show's sixth season in 2015. He advanced through the competition and was eventually declared the winner. Following the show's completion, he went on a tour of Ukraine along with the show's other finalists. In 2016, he released his debut single "Ne odinokaya".

2017–present: Eurovision attempts and new song(s)
On 17 January 2017, Bocharov was announced as one of the 23 competitors in Vidbir 2017, the Ukrainian national selection for the Eurovision Song Contest 2017, with the song "Wonder". Bocharov competed in the third semi-final on 18 February 2017, where he placed second and qualified to the final as one of the top two finishers. In the semi-final, he received the highest number of televotes from the Ukrainian public but only placed fourth with the jury consisting of Konstantin Meladze, Jamala, and Andriy Danylko. The final was held on 25 February 2017. Bocharov placed third, after receiving the highest number of televotes from the Ukrainian public again, but placing second-to-last with the jury.

The following year, Bocharov confirmed his return to Vidbir on 16 January 2018 after being confirmed as one of the 18 competing acts in Vidbir 2018 with the song "Under the Ladder". He competed in the second semi-final on 17 February 2018, where he qualified to the final as one of the top three finishers, placing first with the highest number of televotes from the Ukrainian public and second-highest number of jury votes from the jury consisting of Jamala, Danylko, and Eugene Filatov. He won the final on 24 February and thus represented Ukraine in the Eurovision Song Contest 2018 in Lisbon, Portugal. He placed 17th in the voting in Eurovision Song Contest 2018 final, gaining only eleven points from juries of 43 countries and 119 points from televiewers all around the world. After Eurovision 2018, he went on to release his new single "That's Your Role", which has had many views on YouTube. He won the second season of the Masked Singer Ukraine in December 2021.

Discography

Extended plays

Singles

Personal life

On July 5, 2021, Melovin came out as bisexual in a concert, followed by an Instagram post. In a media interview, he said how he'd known about his sexuality since the age of 13. "I was brought up as a real man who will give way to a woman, give a hand, do not offend with a word, think before saying… I was raised as an adequate person," said the artist, "It's not a choice! It's not fashion! It's not hype! It's not against nature! It's the same love as all of you, but for the opposite sex. And I'm happy… I love people, not their genitals, which is sincere I wish you too! " he said.

References

External links 
 MÉLOVIN Official Website (English)

1997 births
English-language singers from Ukraine
Eurovision Song Contest entrants of 2018
Living people
Musicians from Odesa
Ukrainian electronic musicians
Eurovision Song Contest entrants for Ukraine
Ukrainian pop singers
Ukrainian songwriters
The X Factor winners
Ukrainian people of Russian descent
21st-century Ukrainian male singers
Ukrainian LGBT rights activists
Ukrainian bisexual people
Bisexual musicians
Bisexual men
20th-century Ukrainian LGBT people
21st-century Ukrainian LGBT people
R. Glier Kyiv Institute of Music alumni
LGBT singers